Dennis F. Coughlin  (January 1844 – May 14, 1913) was an American professional baseball player who played as an outfielder during the 1872 season for the Washington Nationals in the National Association.

Coughlin is remembered as the only major leaguer who was wounded in combat in the Civil War. He was a sergeant in Company E, 140th New York Infantry. After his time in baseball, he worked in the U.S. Treasury Department for 45 years.

References

External links

Major League Baseball outfielders
Washington Nationals (NABBP) players
Washington Nationals (NA) players
19th-century baseball players
1844 births
1913 deaths
Baseball players from New York (state)
Union Army soldiers